Arena Hash is the first studio album by Peruvian rock band Arena Hash, released in 1988. This was the first of two albums released by the band before they disbanded after Pedro Suárez-Vértiz decided to go solo. Six songs where released as singles in order to promote the album.

Critical reception

The album was well received in Perú having several hits on the radio. It received a 3 star rating on Rate Your Music.

Singles
Kangrejo (Sacudía) was released in 1987 as the first single of the album. The song had success in Perú where it became a hit even though it didn't reach number one.

Cuando La Cama Me Da Vueltas was released in 1988 as the album's second single. The song became a huge hit in Perú topping the airplay list on several radio stations as soon as it was released becoming the band's first number one hit.

Me Resfrié en Brasil was released as the album's third single in 1988. The song had success in Peruvian radio becoming one of the album's biggest hits.

Stress was released in 1988 as the album's fourth single. The song received moderate airplay in Perú.

No Cambiaré was released in 1988 as the fifth single of the album and it achieved moderate success in Perú.

Rompe Orejas was released as the sixth and final single from the album. It received some airplay but didn't achieve as much as the album's other singles.

Track listing
All songs written by Pedro Suarez-Vertiz, Patricio Suarez-Vertiz and Arturo Pomar Jr. except track 5 (Suarez-Vertiz, Suarez-Vertiz, Pomar, Kornhuber)

Personnel

Arena Hash
Pedro Suárez-Vértiz - guitars, vocals, additional keyboards
Christian Meier - keyboard, backing vocals
Patricio Suárez-Vértiz - bass, backing vocals
Arturo Pomar, Jr. - drums, percussion, backing vocals

Additional Personnel
Carlos Espinoza: Alto Sax on "Stress"
Mickey "Coyote" Denegri: Lead Guitar on "Rompeorejas"
Eduardo Chavez: Lead Guitar on "No Cambiare Jamas" and backing vocals on "Me Resfrie en Brazil"
Lito Figueroa: Additional Keyboards on "Mueve Lo Que Puedas"
German Gonzales: Percussion on "Me Resfrie en Brazil"

References 

Arena Hash albums
1988 debut albums
Spanish-language albums
Peruvian music